The 9th Pan American Games were held in Caracas, Venezuela  from August 14 to August 29, 1983. Antigua and Barbuda competed for the second time at the Pan American Games.

Results by event

See also
Antigua and Barbuda at the 1984 Summer Olympics

References

Nations at the 1983 Pan American Games
Pan American Games
1983